Hattersley railway station serves the Hattersley housing estate in Tameside, Greater Manchester, England.

The station was opened by British Rail in 1978 as an island platform with a covered footbridge leading to the station's exit. It once used to contain a glass waiting room/area, but this was later subjected to an arson attack. Hattersley has been serviced by 3 car trains through its life, but has an extended platform that can comfortably fit 6 car trains. It has car parking spaces and once used to incorporate a bus interchange where the number 216 bus service would run to the station before continuing through Hattersley to the terminus or going to Hyde and Manchester. The station and the line around 1 km to the east of it is currently within a substantial cutting, a new Hattersley Viaduct replacing two tunnels some 400m in length which were likely required to be removed as part of the post-war electrification works.

Facilities
The station has a staffed ticket office at street level, which is staffed six days per week on a part-time basis (Mondays-Fridays 06:20 - 13:25, Saturdays 07:00 - 14:00, closed Sundays).  Outside these times tickets must be purchased on the train or prior to travel.  The only amenities at platform level are a brick shelter (with canopy), timetable posters and lighting.  The entrance and platform are connected via a covered walkway with steps, so no level access is possible for mobility-impaired or wheelchair users.

Services
Monday to Saturday during the daytime, trains run every 30 minutes to Manchester and to Hadfield; extra services run in the weekday business peaks, but trains run every hour after 20.00. On Sundays train services run every 30 minutes to Manchester and to Hadfield until the evening. Early morning, rush hour and late evening services start or terminate at Glossop.

References

External links

Railway stations in Tameside
DfT Category E stations
Railway stations opened by British Rail
Railway stations in Great Britain opened in 1978
Northern franchise railway stations
Hyde, Greater Manchester